Bishop Ireneo "Ali" Amantillo (10 December 1934 – 11 October 2018) was a Filipino Roman Catholic bishop and was the first bishop of the Roman Catholic Diocese of Tandag located in Tandag City, Surigao del Sur. 

Amantillo was born in the Philippines and was ordained to the priesthood in 1962. He served as titular bishop of Girius and was auxiliary bishop of the Roman Catholic Archdiocese of Cagayan   de Oro, Philippines from 1976 to 1978. He was appointed by Pope John Paul I on September 6, 1978 and was installed as the first bishop of the Roman Catholic Diocese of Tandag on November 7, 1978. He reigned from 1978 until his retirement in 2001. He died on October 11, 2018 due to prostate cancer.

Notes

1934 births
2018 deaths
20th-century Roman Catholic bishops in the Philippines
Deaths from prostate cancer
Deaths from cancer in the Philippines